Robert John Callander was the 15th Accountant General and Controller of Revenue in Ceylon.

He was appointed on 3 January 1866, succeeding Richard Pennefather, and held the office until 10 March 1870, when he was succeeded by John Douglas.

References

Auditors General of Sri Lanka
British colonial governors and administrators in Asia
Year of birth missing
Year of death missing